R. L. Foster (December 19, 1919 – December 24, 2005) was an American politician. He served as a Democratic member for the 6-2 district of the Georgia House of Representatives.

Life and career 
Foster was born in Whitfield County, Georgia. He attended the University of Georgia and served in the United States Air Force during World War II.

In 1973, Foster was elected to represent the 6-2 district of the Georgia House of Representatives. He served until 1983, when he was succeeded by Phil Foster.

Foster died in December 2005, at the age of 86.

References 

1919 births
2005 deaths
People from Whitfield County, Georgia
Democratic Party members of the Georgia House of Representatives
20th-century American politicians
University of Georgia alumni